The men's 1500 metres event at the 2005 European Athletics U23 Championships was held in Erfurt, Germany, at Steigerwaldstadion on 15 and 17 July.

Medalists

Results

Final
17 July

Heats
15 July
Qualified: first 4 in each heat and 4 best to the Final

Heat 1

Heat 2

Participation
According to an unofficial count, 21 athletes from 11 countries participated in the event.

 (1)
 (2)
 (3)
 (2)
 (1)
 (1)
 (1)
 (3)
 (1)
 (3)
 (3)

References

1500 metres
1500 metres at the European Athletics U23 Championships